A list of fantasy films released before the 1930s.

References

1900s
Lists of 1900s films by genre
Lists of 1910s films by genre
Lists of 1920s films by genre